Adams Building and variations may refer to

In the United Kingdom
Adams Building, Nottingham, UK

In the Canada
Adams Building, Montreal, Quebec, Canada

In the United States

Adams Cotton Gin Building, Columbus, Georgia, listed on the NRHP in Muscogee County, Georgia
Adams Building (Danville, Illinois), listed on the National Register of Historic Places (NRHP)
Adams-Pickering Block, Bangor, Maine, NRHP-listed
Adams Building (Quincy, Massachusetts), NRHP-listed
Adams Building (Sault Ste. Marie, Michigan), NRHP-listed
Adams Block, Three Forks, Montana, NRHP-listed
Adams Memorial Building, Derry, New Hampshire, NRHP-listed
Adams Odd Fellows Hall, Adams, Oregon, NRHP-listed
John Adams Building of the Library of Congress, Washington, D.C.

See also
Adams School (disambiguation)
Adams House (disambiguation)

Architectural disambiguation pages